The Field Army is a command of the British Army responsible for generating and preparing forces for current and contingency operations.  Commander Field Army reports to the Chief of the General Staff.

Background 
Following the 1966 Defence White Paper, United Kingdom Land Forces was formed, and the post of Deputy Commander-in-Chief, UK Land Forces was created, with the holder having the rank of Lieutenant General.  In 1982, as a result of the 1981 Defence White Paper, this post was redesignated as Commander, United Kingdom Field Army, typically shortened to just 'Commander Field Army'.  Commander Field Army oversaw corps directors such as Commander, Royal Corps of Signals or Commander, Transport and Movements (Royal Corps of Transport).

United Kingdom Field Army was headquartered at Erskine Barracks in Wilton and responsible for organising home defence forces.  The UK Field Army was described by senior officers as "roughly the home equivalent of the British Corps in West Germany", but its commander told Beevor that it was 'not a coherent organisation'. UK Field Army was responsible for all out-of-area operations, training, and home administration.  By 1991, the United Kingdom Field Army presided over nearly 40,000 regular soldiers, just over 70,000 members of the Territorial Army (TA), and 6,000 civilians. In addition to the UK Field Army's defence commitments, the Field Army was responsible for aid to the civil authority.

The post was disestablished in 1995 following the Options for Change defence review.

Land Command was later divided in 2003, under the LANDmark reorganisation, into two suborganisations, Field Army and Regional Forces, that paralleled the Cold War structure of UKLF. Commander Field Army had two deployable divisions (1st Armoured Division, 3rd Mechanised Division), Theatre Troops, Joint Helicopter Command, and Training Support under him. In 2007 it was announced that a new deployable divisional HQ would be established until at least 2011, as a means of meeting the UK's commitments to provide divisional HQs on a rotational basis to Regional Command (South) in Afghanistan and as the lead nation of Multi-National Division (South-East) in Iraq. This was based in York and formed around the re-established 6th Division.

Field Army 

Under another reorganisation effective from 1 November 2011 the Chief of the General Staff took direct command of the Army through a new structure, based at Andover, known as "Army Headquarters".  The post of Commander-in-Chief, Land Forces ceased to exist. In its place a new post of Commander, Land Forces was created, to be held by a lieutenant general (three-star rank).

Following the Strategic Defence and Security Review 2010, the government announced significant changes to the structure of the formations under Land Forces that would be implemented from 2010 - 2020:

 Field Army: By 2020, the total withdrawal of British forces stationed in Germany will be complete, and the Army's operational structure will be formed around a total of five multi-role brigades (MRB); these will be taken from the two brigades currently stationed in Germany under 1st Armoured Division, and three of the four in the UK under 3rd Mechanised Division. To ensure costs are kept down, the MOD's proposal will be to station units as close as possible to training areas. In this process, 19 Light Brigade in Northern Ireland was disbanded.
 Regional Forces: While the regional forces elements have been retained at brigade level, with all ten regional brigades remaining as they are, the regional divisional HQs (2nd Division, 4th Division and 5th Division) were replaced with a single 2-star regional headquarters at Aldershot known as Support Command from Spring 2012.

When Personnel Support Command was established in 2015, it was decided that the role of SJC(UK) Commander was to transfer to Commander PSC in Aldershot. In due course PSC became Home Command.

On 23 November 2015, it was announced that the post of Commander Land Forces would be renamed as Commander Field Army as part of the Army Command Review. CFA will have four brigadiers under their command, namely: Assistant Chief of Staff Commitments, Assistant Chief of Staff Support, Assistant Chief of Staff Warfare and Assistant Chief of Staff Training.  During the reorganisation, the post of Assistant Chief of Staff (Warfare) was to be held by the Director, Land Warfare Centre.

Land Operations Command was established on 2 September 2019 as a staff branch within Headquarters Field Army in Andover.  Through it, Commander Field Army conducts the planning, generation and operational control of all Field Army deployments.

List of structures

End of Cold War (1989) 
{| class="toccolours collapsible collapsed" style="width:100%; background:transparent;"
! colspan="" |United Kingdom Field Army Structure in 1989
|-
| colspan="2" |
 Headquarters, United Kingdom Field Army, at Erskine Barracks, Wilton
 Commander, United Kingdom Field Army  Lieutenant General Sir David John Ramsbotham 
 Field Army Troops, at Erskine Barracks, Wilton
 Commander Electronic Warfare Troops, Royal Corps of Signals
 30th Signal Regiment, Royal Corps of Signals, at Evans Lines, Blandford Camp
 640 Signal Troop (Electronic Warfare), Royal Corps of Signals, at Blandford Camp
 657 Signal Troop (Electronic Warfare), Royal Corps of Signals, at Blandford Camp
 Bowman Military Requirements Team
 Electronic Warfare Operational Support Unit
 Intelligence and Security Group (United Kingdom) (V), HQ in Hackney, London [to BAOR]
 8 Intelligence Company, Intelligence Corps [1 x section to 19th Infantry Bde and 2nd Division]
 9 Security Company, Intelligence Corps
 20 Security Company, Intelligence Corps (V), at Saint John's Wood Barracks, London
 21 Intelligence Company (Imagery Analysis), Intelligence Corps (V), at Ashford House, London
 23 Intelligence Company, Intelligence Corps (V), in Edinburgh
 24 Intelligence Company, Intelligence Corps (V), at Ashford House, London [to HQ BAOR]
 Joint Services Interrogation Organisation [Army Element], at Ashford House, London
 22 Intelligence Company, Intelligence Corps (V), at Ashford House, London
 162 Special Military Intelligence Training Section
 163 (Counter-Intelligence) Section
 Joint Services Intelligence Office (Corps), Intelligence Corps (V), at Ripon Barracks, Bielefeld, West Germany
 Joint Service Intelligence Office (British Support Forces), Intelligence Corps (V), at Ripon Barracks, Bielefeld, West Germany
 Parachute Regiment Group (V), at Arnhem Barracks, Aldershot Garrison (to 1st Armoured Division)
 Group Signal Troop, Royal Corps of Signals (V), at Bruneval Barracks, Aldershot Garrison
 4th (Volunteer) Battalion, The Parachute Regiment (V), at Thornbury Barracks, Pudsey (Parachute Infantry)
 10th (Volunteer) Battalion, The Parachute Regiment (V), at the Duke of York's Headquarters, London (Parachute Infantry)
 15th (Scottish Volunteer) Battalion, The Parachute Regiment (V), at Yorkhill Parade Glasgow (Parachute Infantry)
 Special Air Service Group (V), at Baker Barracks, Thorney Island
 63 (Special Air Service) Signal Squadron, Royal Corps of Signals (V), at Baker Barracks, Thorney Island
 21st Special Air Service Regiment (Artists) (V), in Chelsea, London
 23rd Special Air Service Regiment (V), in Birmingham
 Military Works Force, at Chetwynd Barracks, Chilwell [to Engineer Works Organisation, BAOR]
 62nd Chief Royal Engineers (Works)
 63rd Chief Royal Engineers (Works)
 64th Chief Royal Engineers (Works)
 65th Chief Royal Engineers (Works) (V), at Gibraltar Barracks, Minley
 No. 1 Postal and Courier Group, Royal Engineers (V)
 Headquarters No. 1 Postal and Courier Group, Royal Engineers (V), at Inglis Barracks, Mill Hill
 Headquarters Squadron
 5th Postal and Courier Regiment, Royal Engineers (V)
 6th Postal and Courier Regiment, Royal Engineers (V)
 7th Postal and Courier Regiment, Royal Engineers (V)
 8th Postal and Courier Regiment, Royal Engineers (V)
 3rd Transport Group (Lines of Communications), at McMullen Barracks, Marchwood – formed in 1989
 Headquarters 3rd Transport Group (Lines of Communications)
 Headquarters, Port Task Force
 17th Port and Maritime Regiment, Royal Corps of Transport, at McMullen Barracks, Marchwood
 265 Port Squadron (V), at Prince William of Gloucester Barracks, Grantham
 20th Maritime Regiment, Royal Corps of Transport, at Saint George's Barracks, Gosport
 25 Freight Distribution Squadron, Royal Corps of Transport, at Saint David's Barracks, Bicester Garrison
 53 Port Support Squadron, Royal Corps of Transport
 Headquarters Solent Station
 23rd Pioneer Group, at Saint David's Barracks, Bicester Garrison – battalion sized unit
 187 (Tancred) Pioneer Company, Royal Pioneer Corps (V), at Tidworth Camp [to Commander Labour Resources, 1st British Corps]
 518 Pioneer Company, Royal Pioneer Corps (V), at Bicester Garrison [to Commander Labour Resources, 1st British Corps]
 521 Pioneer Company, Royal Pioneer Corps (V), at Vauxhall Barracks, Didcot
 Logistic Support Group (LSG, 0155), at Butler Barracks, Aldershot Garrison
 524 Specialist Team (Works), Royal Engineers, at Chetwynd Barracks, Chilwell [to Logistic Support Group]
 27th Transport Regiment, Royal Corps of Transport, at Ward Barracks, Bulford Camp
 29th Transport and Movement Regiment, Royal Corps of Transport, at Duke of Gloucester Barracks, South Cerney
 1st Aircraft Support Unit, Royal Army Ordnance Corps, at AAC Middle Wallop
 Joint Helicopter Support Unit (United Kingdom), at RAF Odiham
 United Kingdom Mobile Force RHU (vehicles from 44 Sqn RCT)
 9th Ordnance Battalion, Royal Army Ordnance Corps, at Basil Hill Barracks, Corsham

 22nd Field Hospital, Royal Army Medical Corps, at Aldershot Garrison (cadre, becomes 60 Field Psychiatric Team on mob)
 85th Field Medical Equipment Depot, Royal Army Medical Corps
 Logistic Support Group Information and News Sheet Team, Royal Army Educational Corps
 2nd Signal Brigade, at Basil Hill Barracks, Corsham
 11th Signal Brigade (Volunteers), at Deysbrook Barracks, Liverpool
 12th Signal Brigade (Volunteers), at Duke of York's Headquarters, Chelsea
 1st Infantry BrigadeChappell, pp. 14, at Jellalabad Barracks, Tidworth Camp
 5th Airborne Brigade, at Arnhem Barracks, Aldershot Garrison
 12th (Air Support) Engineer Brigade, at RAF Waterbeach
 30th Engineer Brigade, at Kitchener House, Stafford
 Headquarters ScotlandChappell, pp. 14, at Craighall Camp, Edinburgh
 General Officer Commanding Scotland  Lieutenant General Sir John Richard Alexander MacMillan
 242 Signal Squadron (Scotland), Royal Corps of Signals, at Craighall Camp, Edinburgh
 410 Transport Troop, Royal Corps of Transport
 26th District Workshop, Royal Electrical and Mechanical Engineers, at Forthside Barracks, Stirling
 27 Army Education Centre, Royal Army Educational Corps, at Redford Barracks, Edinburgh
 51st (Highland) Infantry Brigade, in Perth
 52nd (Lowland) Infantry Brigade, at Redford Barracks, Edinburgh
 North East DistrictChappell, pp. 14, at Imphal Barracks, York
 240 Signal Squadron, Royal Corps of Signals, at Imphal Barracks, York
 409 Independent Combat Plant Troop, Royal Engineers (V), at Frenchmans Fort, South Shields [to Commander Royal Engineers, 1st British Corps]
 416 Independent Combat Artisan Troop, Royal Engineers (V), at Mona House, Sutton-on-Hull [to 211th Mobile Civilian Artisan Group]
 40 Transport Squadron, Royal Corps of Transport, at Catterick Garrison
 46 Transport Squadron, Royal Corps of Transport, at Imphal Barracks, York (HQ North East District transport sqn)
 124 (Tyne Electrical Engineers) Recovery Company, Royal Electrical and Mechanical Engineers (V), in Newton Aycliffe [to Commander Maintenance, Corps Troops, 1st British Corps]
 31st District Workshop, Royal Electrical and Mechanical Engineers, at Catterick Garrison
 41st District Workshop, Royal Electrical and Mechanical Engineers, at Queen Elizabeth Barracks, Strensall
 Duchess of Kent's Military Hospital, Catterick, at Catterick Garrison (400 x beds, becomes 34th Evacuation Hospital, RAMC)
 2 Army Education Centre, Royal Army Educational Corps, at Imphal Barracks, York
 3 Army Education Centre, Royal Army Educational Corps, at Catterick Garrison
 146th (North East) Brigade
 Eastern District, at Colchester Garrison
 239 Signal Squadron, Royal Corps of Signals, at Colchester Garrison
 48 Transport Squadron, Royal Corps of Transport, at Colchester Garrison (HQ Eastern District transport sqn)
 118 Recovery Company, Royal Electrical and Mechanical Engineers (V), in Northampton [to Commander Maintenance, BAOR]
 36th District Workshop, Royal Electrical and Mechanical Engineers, at Colchester Garrison
 Rear Combat Zone Defence Animal Support Unit, Royal Army Veterinary Corps (V), in Melton Mowbray [to Commander RAVC, BAOR]
 4 Army Education Centre, Royal Army Educational Corps, at RAF Waterbeach, Waterbeach
 18 Army Education Centre, Royal Army Educational Corps, at Goojerat Barracks, Colchester Garrison
 Central Volunteer Headquarters, Royal Pioneer Corps (V), at Simpson Barracks, Wootton
 54th (East Anglian) Infantry Brigade, at Gibraltar Barracks, Bury Saint Edmunds
 161st (East Anglian) Infantry Brigade
 London District, at Horse Guards, Whitehall, London
 238 (London) Signal Squadron, Royal Corps of Signals, at Chelsea Barracks, London
 101st (London) Engineer Regiment (Explosive Ordnance Disposal), Royal Engineers (V), in Catford [to British Rear Support Command]
 151st (Greater London) Transport Regiment, Royal Corps of Transport (V), in Croydon [to Commander Transport, 1st British Corps]
 873 Movement Light Squadron, Royal Engineers (V), in Acton [to 29th Engineer Brigade]
 20 Transport Squadron, Royal Corps of Transport, at Regent's Park Barracks, London
 56 Transport Squadron, Royal Corps of Transport, at Royal Artillery Barracks, Woolwich Garrison
 144th Field Ambulance, Royal Army Medical Corps (V), in Chelsea (22 x Land Rover Ambulances) [to Logistic Support Group]
 257th (Southern) General Hospital, Royal Army Medical Corps (V), in London (700 x beds) [to Logistic Support Group]
 Queen Elizabeth Military Hospital, Woolwich, at Woolwich Garrison (becomes 30th General Hospital, RAMC on mobilisation, 800 x beds) [to Commander Medical, RCZ]
 Band of the Grenadier Guards, at Wellington Barracks, London (Major Staff Band)
 Band of the Coldstream Guards, at Wellington Barracks, London (Major Staff Band)
 Band of the Scots Guards, at Wellington Barracks, London (Major Staff Band)
 Band of the Irish Guards, at Chelsea Barracks, London (Major Staff Band)
 Band of the Welsh Guards, at Chelsea Barracks, London (Major Staff Band)
 24 Army Education Centre, Royal Army Educational Corps, at Victoria Barracks, Windsor
 30 Army Education Centre, Royal Army Educational Corps, at Royal Artillery Barracks, Woolwich Garrison
 31 Army Education Centre, Royal Army Educational Corps, at Royal Artillery Barracks, Woolwich Garrison
 56th (London) Infantry Brigade,Beevor, pp. 230–242 (UK Land Forces) at Horse Guards, Whitehall, LondonLindsay, pp. 356–357
 South East District, at Aldershot Garrison
 General Officer Commanding-in-Chief, South East District  Lieutenant General Sir Peter Edgar de la Cour de la Billière
 251 Signal Squadron, Royal Corps of Signals, at Duchess of Kent Barracks, Aldershot GarrisonLord & Watson, pp. 101–102
 56 Signal Squadron, Royal Corps of Signals (V), in Eastbourne and Sandgate [to Commander Communications, BAOR]
 135 Independent Topographic Squadron, Royal Engineers (V), in Ewell [to come under 42 Survey Group on mobilisation, but support HQ AFCENT]
 41 Transport Squadron, Royal Corps of Transport, at Mons Barracks, Aldershot Garrison
 55 Ordnance Company (Ammo), Royal Army Ordnance Corps (V) [to 5th Ordnance Bn, Commander Supply, 1st British Corps]
 93 Ordnance Company (V), in Hilsea [to Logistic Support Group]
 9th Field Workshop Company, Royal Electrical and Mechanical Engineers (V), in Hilsea [to Logistic Support Group]
 133 (Kent) Corps Troops Workshop Company, Royal Electrical and Mechanical Engineers (V), in Maidstone [to Commander Maintenance, Corps Troops, 1st British Corps] 30th District Workshop, Royal Electrical and Mechanical Engineers, at Inglis Barracks, Mill Hill
 43rd District Workshop, Royal Electrical and Mechanical Engineers, at Aldershot Garrison
 44th District Workshop, Royal Electrical and Mechanical Engineers, at Templer Barracks, Ashford
 Joint Air Transport Establishment
 Cambridge British Military Hospital, Aldershot, at Aldershot Garrison (becomes 33rd Field Hospital, RAMC on mobilisation) [to Commander Medical, 1st British Corps]
 8 Army Education Centre, Royal Army Educational Corps, at Princess Royal Barracks, Deepcut
 9 Army Education Centre, Royal Army Educational Corps, at Prince Philip Barracks, Bordon Army Camp
 15 Army Education Centre, Royal Army Educational Corps, at Bicester Garrison
 22 Army Education Centre, Royal Army Educational Corps, at Brompton Barracks, Chatham
 77 Army Education Centre, Royal Army Educational Corps, at Saint Omer Barracks, Aldershot Garrison
 Central Volunteer Headquarters, Royal Engineers, at Gibraltar Barracks, Minley
 Central Volunteer Headquarters Royal Engineers, Postal and Courier Service, at Inglis Barracks, Mill Hill
 Headquarters, Royal Army Ordnance Corps Territorial Army, at Blackdown Barracks, Deepcut
 Headquarters, Royal Electrical and Mechanical Engineers Territorial Army, at Louisbourg Barracks, Bordon 2nd (Southeast) Infantry Brigade, at Shorncliffe Army Camp, Cheriton
 145th (Home Counties) Infantry Brigade, at Aldershot Garrison
 South West District, at Bulford Camp
 243 Signal Squadron, Royal Corps of Signals, at Ward Barracks, Bulford Camp
 Independent Field Troop (Allied Mobile Force Land Support), Royal Engineers [to Allied Mobile Force Land]
 2nd Postal and Courier Regiment, Royal Engineers, at Duke of Gloucester Barracks, South Cerney
 Allied Mobile Force Land Logistic Support Battalion, Royal Corps of Transport [to Allied Mobile Force Land]
 222 Transport Squadron, Royal Corps of Transport, at Bulford Camp (HQ South West District transport sqn)
 66 Transport Squadron, Royal Corps of Transport, at Jellalabad Barracks, Tidworth Camp
 Junior Leaders Regiment, Royal Corps of Transport/Royal Army Ordnance Corps, at Azimghur Barracks, Colerne
 27th District Workshop, Royal Electrical and Mechanical Engineers, at Battlesbury Barracks, Warminster [to Allied Mobile Force Land]
 609 Tactical Air Control Party, Army Air Corps (RAF Officer manned) [to Allied Mobile Force Land]
 No. 2 Flight, Army Air Corps, at AAC Netheravon (under admin of 7 Regiment AAC, 6 x Gazelles) [to Allied Mobile Force Land]Davies, p. 5
 Defence Medical Equipment Depot, British Army of the Rhine, in Ludgershall (TTW to 4th Garrison Area, becomes 82nd Field Medical Equipment Depot, RAMC) [to Commander Medical, RCZ]
 6 Army Education Centre, Royal Army Educational Corps, at Battlesbury Barracks, Warminster
 7 Army Education Centre, Royal Army Educational Corps, at Beachley Barracks, Chepstow
 10 Army Education Centre, Royal Army Educational Corps, at Candahar Barracks, Tidworth Camp
 12 Army Education Centre, Royal Army Educational Corps, at Stirling Barracks, Larkhill Garrison
 78 Army Education Centre, Royal Army Educational Corps, at Jellalabad Barracks, Tidworth Camp
 43rd (Wessex) Infantry Brigade, at Wyvern Barracks, Exeter
 Wales District, at The Barracks, Brecon
 414 Combat Artisan Troop, Royal Engineers (V), at Monmouth Castle, Monmouth (to 217th Mobile Civilian Engineer Group, Commander Royal Engineers, BAOR)
 119 (Holywell) Recovery Company, Royal Electrical and Mechanical Engineers (V), in Prestatyn [to Logistic Support Group]
 39th District Workshop, Royal Electrical and Mechanical Engineers, in BridgendKneen & Sutton, p. 259
 160th (Wales) Infantry Brigade, at The Barracks, Brecon
 Western District, at Copthorne Barracks, Shrewsbury
 241 Signal Squadron, Royal Corps of Signals, at Parsons Barracks, DonningtonLord & Watson, pp. 97–98
 413 Combat Artisan Troop, Royal Engineers (V), at Kitchener House, Stafford (to 232nd Mobile Civilian Engineer Group, Commander Royal Engineers, BAOR)
 126 Reclamation Company, Royal Electrical and Mechanical Engineers (V), in Coventry [to Commander Maintenance, Corps Troops, 1st British Corps] 20 Army Education Centre, Royal Army Educational Corps, at Gamecock Barracks, Bramcote
 143rd (West Midlands) Infantry Brigade, at Copthorne Barracks, Shrewsbury
 North West District, at Fulwood Barracks, Preston
 55 (Merseyside) Signal Squadron, Royal Corps of Signals (V), at Aintree Barracks, Liverpool
 411 Independent Combat Plant Troop, Royal Engineers (V), at Gordon House, Walsall (to Commander Engineers, BAOR)
 415 Combat Artisan Troop, Royal Engineers (V), in Failsworth, Manchester (to 221st Mobile Civilian Artisan Group, Commander Engineers, BAOR)
 320 Transport Squadron, Royal Corps of Transport (V) (Home Service Force)
 42nd District Workshop, Royal Electrical and Mechanical Engineers, in LiverpoolKneen & Sutton, p. 259
 1 Army Education Centre, Royal Army Educational Corps, at Fulwood Barracks, Preston
 42nd (North West) Brigade, at Chester Castle, Chester
|}

 Future Army Structure (2008) 

 Army 2020 (2015) 

 Army 2020 Refine (2021) 

 Future Soldier (2030) 

 Commanders 
Following the 1966 Defence White Paper, United Kingdom Land Forces was formed, and the post of Deputy Commander-in-Chief, UK Land Forces was created, with the holder having the rank of Lieutenant General.  In 1982, as a result of the 1981 Defence White Paper, this post was redesignated as Commander, United Kingdom Field Army, typically shortened to just 'Commander Field Army'.  Commander Field Army oversaw several 'deputy commanders', including one each for the services such as Commander, Royal Corps of Signals or Commander, Transport and Movements (Royal Corps of Transport).  The Commander Field Army worked as the official field commander for UK Land Forces during this period, though the post was disestablished in 1995 following the Options for Change.

In November 2015, the post of Commander Land Forces was redesignated as Commander Field Army'''.

Footnotes

Notes

Citations

References

External links 

 Army Command Structure as 2019
 A Guide to Invitations and Appointments for High Commissions and Embassies in London, Ministry of Defence, June 2006 edition

Commands of the British Army
Military units and formations established in 2011